Federal Highway 130D is a toll highway connecting Tuxpan, Veracruz to Gutiérrez Zamora, Veracruz. Its northern portion serves as the northern terminus of the México-Tuxpan highway corridor. The route is maintained and operated by Caminos y Puentes Federales.

Route description

Highway 130D begins in the north with the Puente Tuxpan, crossing the Pantepec River. It is a toll bridge, combined with the  highway; users pay 37 pesos just before meeting the interchange to Gutiérrez Zamora. Travelers can continue south to the Tihuatlán interchange with Mexican Federal Highway 180, where the designation changes to Mexican Federal Highway 132D, or turn off toward Gutiérrez Zamora.

The  Tuxpan-Gutiérrez Zamora segment serves as a northeastern bypass of Poza Rica, ending at Highway 180 between Papantla de Olarte and Gutiérrez Zamora. At the southern terminus, a CAPUFE toll plaza at Totomoxtle charges users 37 pesos.

References 

Mexican Federal Highways